Alpha College of Engineering  is a College of Engineering that is located in Thirumazhisai, Poonamallee, Chennai.

Affiliations
This college is currently affiliated with Anna University, Chennai.

Academics Departments

Academics Departments of  Alpha College of Engineering

 Mechanical Engineering
 Computer Science and Engineering (CSE)
 Electronics and Communication Engineering (ECE)
 Information Technology (IT)
 Biomedical Engineering
 Chemistry
 English
 Mathematics
 Physics
 Master of Business Administration (MBA)
 Physical Education

Highlights
 Alpha College of Engineering was ranked 40th in Top 100 Engineering Colleges 2016 in India by the Siliconindia Magazine
 Center for Excellence in Data Science and Big Data Analytics  under ICT Academy and DELL EMC
 Certification in Core Java by Oracle Academy; 
 CCNA Certification through CISCO Networking Academy

References

Engineering colleges in Chennai